A Próxima Vítima (English: The Next Victim) is a Brazilian telenovela that was produced and aired by TV Globo from March 13, 1995, to November 3, 1995, totaling 203 chapters.

Featured José Wilker, Tony Ramos, Susana Vieira, Aracy Balabanian, Lima Duarte, Natália do Vale, Vivianne Pasmanter, Marcos Frota, Yoná Magalhães, Gianfrancesco Guarnieri, Tereza Rachel, Cecil Thiré and Cláudia Ohana in leading roles.

Cast

References

External links 
 

1995 Brazilian television series debuts
1995 Brazilian television series endings
1995 telenovelas
Television shows set in São Paulo
Brazilian LGBT-related television shows
TV Globo telenovelas
Brazilian telenovelas
Thriller television series
Portuguese-language telenovelas
Serial killers in television
Television series about fictional serial killers
Gay-related television shows